Steel Train was an indie rock band from New Jersey. They have toured with The Juliana Theory, Tegan and Sara, Girl in a Coma, Ben Folds, The Fray, Silversun Pickups, Hanson, The Format, Gomez, O.A.R., Something Corporate, Jack's Mannequin, Barenaked Ladies, fun. and others. Other highlights include performances at Bonnaroo, Lollapalooza, Coachella, Late Night with Conan O'Brien, and Late Show with David Letterman. The band played their final show at the Bowery Ballroom in January 2013.

History

2002–2004: Formation and career beginnings
Steel Train met in the mid-1990s at The Solomon Schechter Day School of Bergen County, New Jersey. At the time, Jack Antonoff (vocals, guitar) and Daniel Silbert (vocals, guitar, sampler) were part of the hardcore band Outline and Evan Winiker (vocals, bass) and Matt Goldman (vocals, guitar) were in the punk band Random Task. After the dissolution of these bands, Steel Train formed in 2002.

The band soon signed to Drive Thru Records/MCA and flew to Los Angeles to record with Jon Naclerio at Hans Zimmer's Media Ventures Studios. The outcome of this session was the band's first EP, 2003's For You My Dear. In January and February 2003, the group supported Finch on their headlining US tour, followed by a support slot for Rx Bandits in July. In January 2004, the band played a handful of shows on the east coast and Midwest.

2005–2009: Twilight Tales From the Prairies on the Sun and Trampoline
After months of touring, the band moved to San Francisco to record their first full-length record with Steven Barncard (Grateful Dead, Crosby, Stills, Nash & Young, Joe Cocker). Released on April 19, 2005, Twilight Tales From The Prairies on the Sun features appearances by famed mandolinist David Grisman, as well as pedal steel guitarist Gene Parsons (The Flying Burrito Brothers/The Byrds).

In 2006 the band toured heavily and was also the beginning of Steel Train's festival career. They played a midnight set on the first day of the Bonnaroo Music Festival in Manchester, Tennessee, as well as the Wakarusa Festival, Warped Tour, SXSW, and another appearance at Bonnaroo in 2006. After two years straight on the road, original members Matt Goldman, Matthias Gruber left the band to pursue other careers. At this point, Antonoff and Winiker moved to Silverlake, CA to record the band's second full-length album, Trampoline, with Mark Trombino. After recording, the band once again embarked on the road, this time recruiting three new members: Jon Shiffman, Justin Huey, and Daniel Silbert, who up to that point had been the band's tour manager.

Trampoline, released in October 2007, debuted at No. 10 on Billboard's Heatseaker Chart. In support of the album, Steel Train toured with Ace Enders and A Million Different People, Socratic, Kevin Devine, The Starting Line, Paper Rival, Bayside, and Forgive Durden, among other bands. They also played prominent spots at the Lollapalooza Festival as well as their third appearance at Bonnaroo.

In the summer of 2008 the band would make their national television debut on Late Night with Conan O'Brien. Following the Late Night with Conan O'Brien performance and a tour with The Hush Sound, the band headed back into the studio, this time to record their third full-length album with producer Steve McDonald (Be Your Own Pet, Fun). It was at this time that the band's relationship with their label, Drive Thru Records, fell apart. Steel Train decided to buy off the label and fund their record themselves. In winter 2009, they opened for Tegan and Sara on their US Tour and appeared at Coachella Music Festival in Indio, California.

2010–2013: Steel Train and disbandment
Once again the band hit the road, touring with Tegan and Sara, Ben Folds, and Fun, as well as playing 2010's Coachella Music Festival and making their 2nd appearance on National TV on the Late Show with David Letterman. The band released their third full-length album, titled Steel Train, on June 29, 2010 through their own label, Terrible Thrills. The record debuted at No. 8 on Billboard's Heatseakers Chart, No. 4 on the New Artists Chart and within the top 50 on the independent albums chart.

In early June 2010 the band announced that they would be releasing a companion album to "Steel Train" featuring female artists covering each of the 12 tracks. The companion album, entitled "Terrible Thrills Vol. 1," includes appearances by Tegan and Sara, Scarlett Johansson, Deradoorian of Dirty Projectors, Amanda Palmer, Anna Waronker of That Dog, Alia Shawkat, Charlotte Caffey of The Go Go's, Rachael Cantu, Rachel Antonoff, Holly Miranda, and Greta Salpeter of The Hush Sound and Gold Motel.

The band hit the road once again with appearances at Yo Gabba Gabba!, the hit children's show, as well as tours with O.A.R., Fun and the Get Up Kids. In August 2010, Steel Train was a guest on Anything Anything with Rich Russo where they performed three songs: "Bullet", "I Feel Weird", and a cover of Tegan and Sara's "Call it Off". On November 1, 2010 the band was the first musical guest on Conan O'Briens new show, Conan, in a joke episode titled "Show Zero". The band, along with actor Jim Parsons (The Big Bang Theory) performed one chord off their new record, Steel Train, in a short version of the show.

In early 2011, the band performed on NPR's World Cafe with David Dye as well as NPR's Free at Noon. On January 11, the band returned to Conan O'Brien's Conan, performing their single "You and I Undercover." Steel Train appeared at Sunfest in West Palm Beach Florida as the opening band for MGMT on April 30, 2011. On November 13, 2012, Jack Antonoff announced on his tumblr that "there are no immediate plans to get things up and running again," and that the band would have a final show at the Bowery Ballroom on January 5, 2013. They returned for the Shadow of the City festival in 2016.

Band members

Discography

Studio albums

Extended plays

Compilation albums

Singles
 Bullet (2010)
 Turnpike Ghost (2010)

References

External links
 Steel Train on Myspace

American folk rock groups
Indie rock musical groups from New Jersey
Musical groups established in 1999
Drive-Thru Records artists
1999 establishments in New Jersey
Musical groups disestablished in 2013